The 1933 Yale Bulldogs football team represented Yale University in the 1933 college football season.  The Bulldogs were led by first-year head coach Reginald D. Root, played their home games at the Yale Bowl and finished the season with a 4–4 record.

Schedule

References

Yale
Yale Bulldogs football seasons
Yale Bulldogs football